The Roman Catholic Diocese of Dharmapuri is a diocese located in the city of Dharmapuri in the Ecclesiastical province of Pondicherry and Cuddalore in India. This Diocese administrate the political region of Dharmapuri district and Krishnagiri district.

History
 January 24, 1997: Established as Diocese of Dharmapuri from the Diocese of Salem

Leadership
 Bishops of Dharmapuri (Latin Rite)
 Bishop Joseph Anthony Irudayaraj, S.D.B. (January 24, 1997 – January 13, 2012)
 Bishop Lawrence Pius Dorairaj (since January 13, 2012)

Parishes

This Diocese has 45 Parish, which are bifurcated under 5 Vicariates

± = also Vicariate parish

References

External links
 GCatholic.org 
 Catholic Hierarchy 

Roman Catholic dioceses in India
Christian organizations established in 1997
Roman Catholic dioceses and prelatures established in the 20th century
Christianity in Tamil Nadu